Among the numerous literary works titled Collected Poems are the following:

Collected Poems (Achebe) by Chinua Achebe
Collected Poems (Berry) by Wendell Berry
Collected Poems (Boyle) by Kay Boyle
Collected Poems (Browning) by Robert Browning
Collected Poems (Caudwell) by Christopher Caudwell
Collected Poems (Goodman) by Paul Goodman
Collected Poems (Hardy) by Thomas Hardy
Collected Poems (Hughes) by Ted Hughes
Collected Poems (Larkin) by Philip Larkin
Collected Poems (Levi) by Primo Levi
Collected Poems (Lovecraft) by H. P. Lovecraft
Collected Poems (MacDiarmid) by Hugh MacDiarmid
Collected Poems (Moore) by Marianne Moore
Collected Poems (Neilson) by Shaw Neilson 
The Collected Poems (Plath) by Sylvia Plath
Collected Poems (Stevens) by Wallace Stevens
Collected Poems (Tierney) by Richard L. Tierney

See also
Collected works (disambiguation)
List of poetry collections
Selected Poems (disambiguation)